Yanxi may refer to:

Locations in China
Fujian
Yanxi, Changtai County (岩溪), a town in Changtai County
Yanxi Subdistrict (燕西街道), a subdistrict in Yong'an

Hunan
Yanxi, Anhua County (烟溪), a town in Anhua County
Yanxi, Liuyang (沿溪), a town in Liuyang
Yanxi Township, Hunan (沿溪乡), a township in Xupu County

Jiangxi
Yanxi, Taihe County (沿溪), a town in Taihe County, Jiangxi
Yanxi, Xiajiang County (砚溪), a town in Xiajiang County

Other provinces
Yanxi, Chongqing (沿溪), a town in Shizhu Tujia Autonomous County, Chongqing
Yanxi Township, Sichuan (烟溪乡), a township in Tongjiang County, Sichuan

Historical eras
Yanxi (延熹, 158–167), era name by Emperor Huan of Han
Yanxi (延熙, 238–257), era name by Liu Shan, emperor of Shu Han
Yanxi (延熙, 334), era name by Shi Hong, emperor of Later Zhao